The Tiger 25 is a British trailerable sailboat that was designed by John A. Butler as a cruiser and first built in 1969.

The Tiger 25 is a development of the  Westerly Cirrus that was designed by Laurent Giles.

Production
The design was built by Westerly Marine Construction in the United Kingdom between 1969 and 1976, with 284 boats completed. It was replaced in the company product line by the Westerly Pembroke.

Design
The Tiger 25 is a recreational keelboat, built predominantly of glassfibre, with wood trim. It has a masthead sloop rig, a spooned raked stem, a plumb transom, an internally mounted spade-type rudder controlled by a wheel and a fixed square fin keel. It displaces  and carries  of iron ballast.

The design has sleeping accommodation for five people, with a double "V"-berth in the bow cabin, an "L"-shaped settee around a dinette table in the main cabin and two quarter berths aft. The galley is located on the port side just forward of the companionway ladder. The galley is equipped with a stove and a sink. The head is located in the bow cabin on the starboard side.

Operational history
The boat is supported by an active class club that organizes sailing events, the Westerly Owners Association.

See also
List of sailing boat types

References

Keelboats
1960s sailboat type designs
Sailing yachts
Trailer sailers
Sailboat type designs by John A. Butler
Sailboat types built by Westerly Marine Construction